The Ottawa Board of Control was an important part of the governance of Ottawa, Ontario from 1908 until 1980 when it was abolished. Through the 19th century Ottawa had been governed by a mayor and city council, but most councillors were only part-time and could spend only a few hours per week on municipal issues. Mayor Arthur Ellis found this problematic as there was little time for real scrutiny of important issues. He thus proposed creating a five member board of control consisting of the mayor and four members elected at large from across the city. At the same time the number of councillors would be reduced by a third.

City council rejected this plan, as it would reduce both their authority and their numbers. In the 1908 municipal election the question was brought to a referendum, and was approved and the new board was created. In 1910 city council held a second referendum on whether the board should be abolished, and the people of Ottawa overwhelmingly voted in favour of keeping the board.

The board was elected across the entire city of Ottawa with the four candidates receiving the most votes being added to the board. The member of the board of control who received the most votes was also made deputy mayor, and was the legal successor to the mayor should they resign or die in office. The board of control was abolished in 1980 by the Ontario Municipal Board after a council vote for its abolition.

Municipal government of Ottawa